Saints Cyrion and Candidus (died 320 AD) are Armenian saints.  They and the Forty Armenian Martyrs are venerated on March 10.

References

Armenian saints
Saints duos
320 deaths
4th-century Christian saints
Year of birth unknown